Vincent Henry Stanton (1 June 1846 – 8 June 1924) was Regius Professor of Divinity at Cambridge University. He is buried in the Parish of the Ascension Burial Ground in Cambridge; he was a member of the Cambridge Apostles intellectual secret society.

References 
 ‘STANTON, Rev. Vincent Henry’, Who Was Who, A & C Black, an imprint of Bloomsbury Publishing plc, 1920–2008; online edn, Oxford University Press, Dec 2007 accessed 8 March 2013

External links
 

1846 births
1924 deaths
Alumni of Trinity College, Cambridge
Fellows of Trinity College, Cambridge
Regius Professors of Divinity (University of Cambridge)
British theologians
Ely Professors of Divinity